The 10th Northwest Territories Legislative Assembly was the 17th assembly of the territorial government held between 1983 and 1987.

3rd Session
The spring field session of the Legislative Assembly was held from June 5, 1985, to June 13, 1985, in the gymnasium of Maani Ulujuk School in Rankin Inlet, Nunavut. This was the first time since 1976 that the Legislature was held in the community.

District renaming
Three electoral districts were renamed in the June 1985 spring session to better reflect the quality of the areas represented. Deh Cho Gah became Nahendeh meaning Our Land, Kitikimeot East became Natilikmiot meaning people of seals and Foxe Basin was renamed Amittuq meaning a long, narrow land formation.

References

External links
Northwest Territories Legislative Assembly homepage

Northwest Territories Legislative Assemblies